Veronica Elizabeth Marian Forrest-Thomson (28 November 1947 – 26 April 1975) was a poet and a critical theorist brought up in Scotland. Her 1978 study Poetic Artifice: A Theory of Twentieth-Century Poetry was reissued in 2016.

Life and education
Veronica was born in Malaya to a rubber planter, John Forrest Thomson and his wife Jean, but grew up in Glasgow, Scotland. She opted to hyphenate the surname, having originally been published under the name Veronica Forrest.

She studied at the University of Liverpool (BA, 1967) and Girton College, Cambridge (PhD, 1971) where her first supervisor was the poet J. H. Prynne. Her Cambridge friends included the poets Wendy Mulford and Denise Riley.

Forrest-Thomson later taught at the universities of Leicester and Birmingham.

Writings
Forrest-Thomson's critical study Poetic Artifice: A Theory of Twentieth-Century Poetry was published by Manchester University Press in 1978. It was reissued with notes and an introduction by Gareth Farmer in 2016 with Shearsman press. Her poetry collections included Identi-kit (1967), the award-winning Language-Games (1971) and the posthumous On the Periphery (1976). Subsequent gatherings of her work include Collected Poems and Translations (1990) and Selected Poems (1999). A further Collected Poems, minus the translations, was published in 2008 by Shearsman Books with Allardyce Books.

Forrest-Thomson died in her sleep on 26 April 1975 at the age of 27, after an accidental overdose of prescription drugs and alcohol. She was married to the writer and academic Jonathan Culler from 1971 to 1974; he became the executor of her literary estate. In November 2019, Jonathan Culler passed the role of literary executor to the academic and poet Gareth Farmer.

Further reading
Veronica Forrest-Thomson, Collected Poems and Translations, 1990
Veronica Forrest-Thomson, Poetic Artifice: A Theory of Twentieth-century Poetry, 1978
Veronica Forrest-Thomson, Poetic Artifice: A Theory of Twentieth-century Poetry, ed. Gareth Farmer, 2016
Alison Mark, Veronica Forrest-Thomson and Language Poetry, 2001
Gareth Farmer, Veronica Forrest-Thomson: Poet on the Periphery, 2017. 
Gareth Farmer, Veronica Forrest-Thomson, Poetic Artifice and the Struggle with Forms (Sussex: unpublished PhD thesis) 
Gareth Farmer, "Veronica Forrest-Thomson's 'Cordelia', Tradition and the Triumph of Artifice", Journal of British and Irish Innovative Poetry, 1.1 (September, 2009) pp. 55–78
Gareth Farmer, "The slightly hysterical style of University talk: Veronica Forrest-Thomson and Cambridge", Cambridge Literary Review 1.1 (September, 2009), pp. 161–177
Isobel Armstrong, The Radical Aesthetic, 2000
Jane Dowson and Alice Entwistle, A History of Twentieth-Century British Women's Poetry, 2005
Alison Mark, "Poetic Relations and Related Poetics: Veronica Forrest-Thomson and Charles Bernstein" in Romana Huk (ed.), Assembling Alternatives: Reading Postmodern Poetries Transnationally, 2003
Christian R. Gelder, "Veronica Forrest-Thomsom's ABC of Atoms: Poetry, Knowledge, Technique", Cambridge Quarterly, 51.1, (March, 2022), pp. 1–19

References

External links
Veronica Forrest-Thomson, Five poems
Brian Kim Stefans, Veronica Forrest-Thomson and High Artifice
Peter Robinson, A review of On the Periphery
James Keery, ‘Jacob’s Ladder’ and the Levels of Artifice: Veronica Forrest-Thomson on J H Prynne
Kenyon Review Online Web Feature
https://beds.academia.edu/GarethFarmer

1947 births
1975 deaths
Academics of the University of Birmingham
Academics of the University of Leicester
Alumni of the University of Cambridge
Alumni of the University of Liverpool
Critical theorists
Writers from Glasgow
Scottish women poets
20th-century Scottish poets
20th-century Scottish women writers
Alumni of Girton College, Cambridge